Usermin is a webmail interface for regular non-root users to access their email, change their password, set up email filters, email forwarding rules, autoresponders, and much more. With it designed for deployment by system administrators on a Unix-like system the sysadmin will set limits for their customer's so that they can only access the tasks that they would be able to perform if they were logged in via SSH or at the console.

Usermin is distributed under the BSD licence and can be deployed for use using the Usermin Configuration Module within Webmin by the administrator.  Since Usermin has an extensive collection of modules the administrator has control over exactly what the end user can see and access.  Usermin also provides web interfaces for the viewing and managing of the data in MySQL and PostgreSQL databases, plus editing of the Apache .htaccess configuration files, and also allows for the running of commands on the server by the administrator and any users given the permissions to do so.

Usermin is written in Perl 5 using the Authen::PAM Perl module and deployed on port 20000 by default.  Any changes by the system administrator of Usermin from its default settings will result in the changes being written in the system configuration files directly.

Uses 
Usermin is designed for normal users for such simple tasks as:
 Reading email
 Changing passwords
 Setting up email filters
 Configuring email forwardings
 Creating automatic responders

Notable people 
Jamie Cameron: Author and lead developer of Usermin.
Ilia Rostovtsev:  Author of default Authentic Theme and contributor to Usermin.
John Smith:  Idea for Usermin and sponsorship for its development.

References

External links 

Official Usermin website

Unix configuration utilities
Software using the BSD license